EVOtv is a Croatian Pay TV provider founded and previously owned by Croatian Post, in 2018 purchased by T-HT (Croatian Telecom). EVOtv offers Pay TV Digital Terrestrial Television based on DVB-T2 Technology. The service was introduced in December 2012 and currently carries 56 TV channels.

EVOtv channel line-up 

The program packages offered by EVOtv currently (as June 2020) offers 55 TV channels.

100 - EVOtv info
101 - Da Vinci
102 - Laudato TV
103 - EVOtv portal
105 - Al Jazeera Balkans
106 - CNN
107 - National Geographic
108 - NatGeo Wild
109 - Viasat Explore
110 - Viasat History
112 - Epic Drama
113 - Doku TV HD
114 - Viasat Nature HD
199 - HBO HD
200 - HBO2 HD
201 - HBO3 HD
202 - Cinemax
203 - Cinemax 2
204 - Klasik TV
205 - TV1000
206 - AXN
207 - Movie Generation
208 - RTL Living
209 - KinoTV
210 - Cinestar TV
211 - FOX
212 - Fox Life
213 - M1 FILM
214 - M1 GOLD
215 - CineStar TV Premiere 1 HD
216 - CineStar TV Premiere 2 HD
217 - CineStar TV Action & Thriller
218 - CineStar TV Fantasy
219 - Fox Crime
220 - Fox Movies
301 - Toon kids
302 - Baby TV
303 - Boomerang
304 - Cartoon Network
305 - Nickelodeon
306 - Nick Jr.
400 - Arenasport 1
401 - Arenasport 2
402 - Arenasport 3
403 - Arenasport 4
404 - Arenasport 5
405 - Arenasport 6
406 - HNTV
500 - 24Kitchen
600 - MTV
601 - VH1
603 - DM SAT
604 - Jugoton
605 - RTL Crime
606 - RTL Adria
607 - RTL Passion
751 - Vivid
799 - Test

References

External links 
 

Pay television
Television networks in Croatia
2012 establishments in Croatia